Gyeongju University (originally Korea Tourism University) is a privately run, 4-year university located in Gyeongju, North Gyeongsang province, South Korea.

History
Established in 1988 as Korea Tourism University, Gyeongju University originally consisted of five departments: the Department of Tourism Business Administration, the Department of Tourism and Public Administration, the Department of Tourism Development, the Department of Cultural Assets and The Department of English and Tourism.  The university expanded in later years to include several other departments, as well as a graduate school (founded in 1995).  In 1993, the university changed its name to its current one.

In September 2013, the university was one of thirty-five private colleges and universities that were cut off from all government aid and prohibited from participating in any federally funded research.  The cuts were done at least in part as a response to the fast-approaching sharp decline in college-age students.  The schools designated were those constituting the lowest scoring schools based on an eight-factor evaluation.

Academics
Although tourism remains a major focus of the university, Gyeongju University has also made efforts to develop and promote programs in high-tech fields such as information technology and computer science.  In addition, the school's continuing education center gives local residents the opportunity to further their education in various fields.  Like most universities in Korea, the academic year begins in February–June (1st Semester) and ends in September to December (2nd Term), with a summer and winter vacation between semesters.

Campus life
The campus of Gyeongju University is situated on the slopes of Mt. Sondo in the western outskirts of Gyeongju.  Although many of the students commute to and from the school from their homes in surrounding areas, the opening of a student dormitory in 2004 gave students the chance to live on campus.  The university holds two festivals yearly for the students and members of the community: a school festival, typically held in the spring, and a sports festival held in the autumn.

Undergraduate colleges
School of Tourism Studies
School of Foreign Languages and Tourism
School of Law and Public Administration
School of Construction & Environment System Engineering
School of Business Administration & Advertising
School of Computer & Information Science
Department of Cultural Assets
Department of Creative Writing
Department of Community Sports and Recreation
Department of Visual Arts

Graduate colleges
Department of Tourism Business Administration
Department of Tourism Development
Department of Cultural Assets
Department of Environmental Landscale Architecture
Department of Hotel Administration
Department of Local Government
Department of Business Management

References

External links
Gyeongju University home page 

Universities and colleges in Gyeongju
Educational institutions established in 1988
1988 establishments in South Korea